LRB may refer to:
 Love Runs Blind, a Bangladeshi rock band
 Lego Rock Band, a game in the Rock Band video game series
 Liquid rocket booster
 Little Red Book, quotations from Chairman Mao
 Little River Band, an Australian music act
 London Review of Books, a British journal of literary and intellectual essays
 Lonesome River Band, an American bluegrass band
 London Road (Brighton) railway station, a railway station in Sussex, England

See also 
L:RB, stock symbol for the consumer goods company Reckitt Benckiser